Peter J. Johnson, (born 18 February 1954 in Hackney, Greater London) is an English, retired professional footballer who played as a winger but who could also play in a more central role. Johnson made a total of 117 appearances in the Football League for Leyton Orient, Crystal Palace and Bournemouth between 1971 and 1979, before moving into non-league football with Weymouth He also had a spell in mid-career with AEK Athens.

Playing career
Johnson began his career as an amateur with Tottenham Hotspur, but did not make a senior appearance for the club, signing instead for Leyton Orient in 1971. However, after only three appearances in two seasons, Johnson signed for Greek side AEK Athens. In January 1975, Johnson signed for Crystal Palace and made his debut on 4 January in a home 2–2 draw with Hereford United. Johnson made only three further appearances that season and three at the end of the 1975–76 season as Palace's campaign tailed off after defeat in the F.A. Cup semi-final and the club failed to gain promotion from the old Football League Third Division. In June 1976, Johnson moved on to Bournemouth where he made 107 appearances over three seasons, scoring 11 goals. In 1979, Johnson moved into non-league football with Weymouth F.C.

References

External links
Johnson at holmesdale.net

1954 births
Living people
Footballers from the London Borough of Hackney
English footballers
English Football League players
Association football midfielders
Leyton Orient F.C. players
AEK Athens F.C. players
Crystal Palace F.C. players
AFC Bournemouth players
Weymouth F.C. players